Nikolai Shpanov (Николай Николаевич Шпанов, Nikolay Shpanov, Nikolai Španov) (1896–1961) was a Russian political writer, who wrote Incendiaries, 1949, in which he described the lead-up of the Second World War.

Bibliography 

 The First Blow (Pervii Udar, 1939. Published before the signing of the Molotov-Ribbentrop Pact, it is a fictional account of the upcoming war between Third Reich and the Soviet Union. The Soviet Air Force stages a highly successful raid on industrial targets in Nuremberg. It was withdrawn from bookstores after the Molotov–Ribbentrop Pact on cooperation between the Soviet Union and the Nazi Germany was signed.)
 Incendiaries (Podzhigateli, 1949)

References

External links 

 Books by Nikolai Shpanov @ ozon.ru
 Text of the Book by Nikolay Shpanov Wizard's apprentice
Raamatukoi. Nikolai Španov
"Библиотека Luksian key"

Russian writers
1896 births
1961 deaths